Kwong Fuk Estate is a public housing estate in Tai Po, New Territories, Hong Kong. It is the second public housing estate in Tai Po, built at the reclaimed land at the east of Tai Po Old Market near Yuen Chau Tsai. The estate consists of eight residential buildings completed in 1983.

Wang Fuk Court is a Home Ownership Scheme court in Tai Po, near Kwong Fuk Estate. It consists of eight residential buildings offering 1,987 units built in 1983.

Houses

Kwong Fuk Estate

Wang Fuk Court

Demographics
According to the 2016 by-census, Kwong Fuk Estate had a population of 16,939 while Wang Fuk Court had a population of 4,789. Altogether the population amounts to 21,728.

Politics
For the 2019 District Council election, the estate fell within two constituencies. Most of the estate is located in the Kwong Fuk & Plover Cove constituency, which was represented by Dalu Lin Kok-cheung until May 2021, while the remainder of the estate and Wang Fuk Court falls within the Wang Fuk constituency, which is represented by Herman Yiu Kwan-ho.

See also

Public housing estates in Tai Po

References

Residential buildings completed in 1983
Tai Po
Public housing estates in Hong Kong
Housing estates with centralized LPG system in Hong Kong